Banyan Tree Holdings Limited (also known as Banyan Tree Group) is a Singaporean multinational hospitality brand that manages and develops resorts, hotels and spas in Asia, America, Africa and the Middle East. The brand was established in 1994. , the company operates 55 resorts and hotels. Under its management are also 63 spas, 64 retail galleries, and three championship golf courses in 23 countries.

The group has 10 brands: Banyan Tree (an all-villa concept which pioneered pool villas and the tropical garden spa); extensions Banyan Tree Escape and Banyan Tree Veya; Angsana; Cassia; Dhawa; Laguna; Homm; Garrya; and Folio.

History
Banyan Tree started when founder Ho Kwon Ping and his wife Claire Chiang came across a plot of land while they were on holiday in Bang Tao Bay, on the western coast of Phuket in the Andaman Sea, and thought it would make an ideal location for a resort. They purchased the land and then discovered that it was an abandoned tin mine and too polluted to support vegetation or any developments. They embarked on a regeneration programme, reintroducing indigenous plants and building 7,000 trees. Ten years later in 1994, the first resort Banyan Tree Phuket was built.

In 2009, Banyan Tree Global Foundation was created as part of Banyan Tree Holdings Limited. The foundation serves as the corporate social responsibility (CSR) arm of the group and works to enhance social, environmental and economic well-being. Projects under the foundation includes Greening Communities, Seedlings, and Earth Day.

In December 2016, Banyan Tree entered into a partnership with a French hospitality company Accor. As part of the deal, Accor would invest €16 million to Banyan Tree in exchange for a 5% stake in the company, with an option to purchase an additional 5% stake.

In May 2019, Banyan Tree announced its first resort in Singapore on a  site in Mandai.

List of properties

See also
Banyan

References

External links

Angsana official website

Holding companies established in 1994
Companies listed on the Singapore Exchange
Companies of Singapore
Hotel chains
Resorts
Singaporean brands
Hospitality companies of Singapore
Hotel chains in Singapore
Singaporean companies established in 1994
Hotels established in 1994
Accor